Anthem is the sixth studio album released by American pop rock group Hanson. The album is the fourth release through their own label 3CG Records. The album was released on June 18, 2013 in the US and on July 1, 2013 in the UK and Europe. The album charted at No. 22 on the US Billboard 200, making it their eighth album to chart in the top 40 of the US Billboard 200; the album also charted on No. 5 on the US Independent Albums Chart.

On April 5, a blog on the group's website written by Zac Hanson revealed that three songs were cut from the album; "Nothing on Me" (lead vocal by Isaac), "Get So Low" (lead vocal by Zac) and "All I Ever Needed" (lead vocal by Taylor).

Track listing
All songs written and produced by Isaac Hanson, Taylor Hanson and Zac Hanson.

Personnel
As listed at allmusic

Hanson
Taylor Hanson: Acoustic and Fender Rhodes electric piano, Wurlitzer, Hammond organ, clapping, drums, percussion, vocals
Isaac Hanson: Acoustic and electric guitars, bass, clapping, vocals
Zac Hanson: Drums, percussion, clapping, vocals

Additional personnel
Chad Copelin, Joe Karnes – Bass
Imani Coppola, Curtis Stewart – Violin
Dan Higgins – Saxophone
Bill Reichenbach – Trombone
Tom Malone – Saxophone, trumpet, trombone
Yuri Lemeshev – Accordion
Michael Fitzpatrick – Vocals
Strings arranged by Imani Coppola; horns arranged by Jerry Hey and Tom Malone

Production
Arranged and produced by Hanson
Recording engineers: Steve Churchyard and Ryan Williamson; assisted by Manuel Calderón, Charles Godfrey and David Schwerkolt
Mixed by Tom Lord-Alge
Mastered by Andrew Mendelson

Release history

Chart positions

References

2013 albums
Hanson (band) albums